In the American Civil War, a Skirmish at Abingdon, Virginia between Union Army and Confederate States Army forces occurred on December 15, 1864 during Stoneman's 1864 Raid.

References

External links 
 

Abingdon
Abingdon
Conflicts in 1864
1864 in Virginia
December 1864 events
Washington County, Virginia